Cartoonmuseum Basel is the only museum and centre of excellence in Switzerland devoted exclusively to the art of narrative drawing, be it in comics, graphic novels, comics reportage, cartoons, satirical drawings or animated films. It collects individual works, curates exhibitions and shares knowledge about the genre. The museum contributes to the debate about the art of narrative drawing, and about the social and political issues it addresses.

The museum possesses a substantial collection of over 10,000 original drawings by renowned national and international artists. The museum’s focus lies on curated exhibitions displaying the works of a single artist or illustrating a specific theme. The exhibitions are supplemented by a wide range of art-education activities, such as guided tours, workshops and talks. 

A museum library contains primary and secondary literature on the caricature, cartoon and comic, and presents a broad spectrum of popular and alternative culture and subculture. The museum shop offers a wide range of postcards, selected monographs, cartoon books and comic books, adapted to suit the respective exhibition.

Collection history and building 

Cartoonmuseum Basel’s founder and benefactor was Dieter Burckhardt (1914–1991), an important patron from a well-to-do Basel family, who wanted to make his private collection of caricatures and cartoons accessible to a wider audience. In 1979, he founded the foundation Stiftung Sammlung Karikaturen & Cartoons, which has been managed by the larger Christoph Merian Stiftung ever since. In 1980, the first exhibition opened at St. Alban-Vorstadt 9 under the name of Karikatur & Cartoon Museum Basel. The museum’s collection is enlarged on a regular basis, be it through the acquisition of selected works or the absorption of entire collections. 

The museum is located on the historic street St. Alban-Vorstadt in Basel. In 1991, the foundation bought the building at St. Alban-Vorstadt 28, which was subsequently restored and extended by Herzog & de Meuron Architects. In May 1996, the new Karikatur & Cartoon Museum Basel was opened to the public. In 2009, it was renamed Cartoonmuseum Basel.

Exhibitions (selection) 
 2008/2009 Sempé
 2011 Ralf König. Gottes Werk und Königs Beitrag
 2012 Winsor Mc Cay. Comics, Filme, Träume
 2012/2013 Comics Deluxe! Das Comicmagazin Strapazin
 2013/2014 Die Abenteuer der Ligne claire. Der Fall Herr G. & Co.
 2014/2015 Joost Swarte. Zeichner und Gestalter
 2015/2016 Joe Sacco. Comics Journalist
 2016 Aline Kominsky-Crumb & Robert Crumb. Drawn Together
 2016/2017 dr. Zep & mr. Titeuf
 2017 Christoph Niemann. That’s How!
 2017/2018 Lorenzo Mattotti. Imago
 2018/2019 Le Monde de Tardi
 2019 Joann Sfar. Sans début ni fin
 2020/2021 Brecht Evens. Night Animals

Publications (selection) 
 How to Love. Graphic Novellas by Actus Comics. Cartoonmuseum Basel (Hg.). Christoph Merian Verlag, 2011, 
 Comics Deluxe! Das Comicmagazin Strapazin. Cartoonmuseum Basel (Hg.). Christoph Merian Verlag, 2012, 
 Joost Swarte. Zeichner und Gestalter. Anette Gehrig (Hg.). Cartoonmuseum Basel.  2014, 
 Zeichner als Reporter. Joe Sacco. Comics Journalismus. Pierre Thomé, Anette Gehrig, Yves Noyau (Hg.). Christoph Merian Verlag, 2015, 
 Aline Kominsky-Crumb & Robert Crumb. Drawn Together. Anette Gehrig (Hg.). Christoph Merian Verlag, 2016, 
 Lorenzo Mattotti. Ligne Fragile. Anette Gehrig (Hg.). Christoph Merian Verlag, 2017, 
 Joann Sfar. Ohne Anfang und Ende – Comic in Arbeit. Anette Gehrig (Hg.). Cartoonmuseum Basel, 2019
 Victoria Lomasko. Other Russias. Anette Gehrig (Hg.). Cartoonmuseum Basel, 2019
 Tom Tirabosco. Trente oiseaux morts. Anette Gehrig (Hg.). Cartoonmuseum Basel, 2019
 Christoph Fischer. Während ich schlief. Anette Gehrig (Hg.). Christoph Merian Verlag, 2020, 
 Brecht Evens. Idulfania. Cartoonmuseum Basel, Anette Gehrig (Hg.). Christoph Merian Verlag, 2020,

Directors and curators 
 1979–1994 Jürg Spahr
 1995–2004 Daniel Bolsiger
 2004–2007 Simone Thalmann, Michael Mauch
 2008 Anna Bonacci (Januar bis August 2008, ad interim)
 Seit 2008 Anette Gehrig

See also 
Museums in Basel
Museums-PASS-Musées
Cartoon Art Museum
Museum of Comic and Cartoon Art
The Cartoon Museum

Footnotes

External links 

Cartoonmuseum Basel website
Basel museums website

Art museums established in 1979
Art museums and galleries in Switzerland
Museums in Basel
Cultural property of national significance in Basel-Stadt
Cartooning museums
Herzog & de Meuron buildings
1979 establishments in Switzerland